Tetragraptus is an extinct genus of graptolites from the Ordovician period.

Species 
 T. akzharensis
 T. approximatus
 T. fruticosus
 T. insuetus

Distribution 
Fossils of Tetragraptus have been found in Argentina, Australia, Bolivia, Canada (Quebec, Yukon, Newfoundland and Labrador and Northwest Territories), Chile, China, Colombia (near Caño Cristales, Meta), the Czech Republic, France, Morocco, New Zealand, Norway, the Russian Federation, Spain, Sweden, the United Kingdom, and the United States (Alaska, Idaho, Nevada, Utah).

References

Further reading 
 

Graptoloidea
Graptolite genera
Ordovician animals of Africa
Ordovician animals of Asia
Ordovician animals of Europe
Ordovician animals of North America
Ordovician Canada
Ordovician United States
Ordovician animals of South America
Ordovician Argentina
Ordovician Bolivia
Ordovician Chile
Ordovician Colombia
Fossils of Colombia
Fossil taxa described in 1863
Paleozoic life of Newfoundland and Labrador
Paleozoic life of the Northwest Territories
Paleozoic life of Quebec